The 1938–39 British Home Championship was a football tournament played between the British Home Nations during the 1938–39 seasons and was the last edition of the tournament to be completed before the outbreak of the Second World War in August 1939 suspended all professional sporting competitions. As a result, this was the final opportunity for many spectators to see their sporting heroes in an international setting, as players such as Wales's Dai Astley or Scotland's Tommy Walker would no longer be young enough to play for their country by the time professional football began again in 1946.

The opening matches saw an immediate advantage for Wales and Scotland who beat England and Northern Ireland respectively. Scotland then followed by beating the Welsh in their second match during a close contest whilst England succeeded in victory over the Irish by a seven-goal margin to bring them into joint second place behind the Scots. During the match, Willie Hall scored five goals, an English record that has been equalled but never broken as of 2007. In the final games, Wales beat the Irish resulting in a whitewash of three defeats for Ireland and joint first place for the Welsh. England joined Wales and Scotland on four points with a 2–1 victory over Scotland in Glasgow to share the title between the three nations, as goal difference was not at this stage used to determine position. The win was sealed by a goal from Tommy Lawton, who scored in all of England's matches

Table

Results

References 

1938–39 in English football
1938–39 in Scottish football
1938–39 in Welsh football
1938 in British sport
1939 in British sport
1938-39
1938–39 in Northern Ireland association football